Uganda competed in the 2010 Commonwealth Games held in Delhi, India, from 3 to 14 October 2010. Sixty five athletes and eighteen officials attended the games. The athletes competed in badminton, rugby, squash, tennis, table tennis, swimming and athletics.

Medals

Medalists

See also
 2010 Commonwealth Games

References

Nations at the 2010 Commonwealth Games
2010 in Ugandan sport
Uganda at the Commonwealth Games